Western Australian soccer clubs from the top three State-Based Divisions, plus the Premier Division of the Sunday League, competed in 2012 for the WA State Challenge Cup, known that year as the State League Cup 2012.  This knockout competition was won by Sorrento, their 2nd title.

Preliminary round
A total of 30 Western Australian teams took part in this stage of the competition. This involved 13 clubs from the State League Division 1, 7 clubs from the State League Division 2 and 10 clubs from the 2013 Sunday League (Premier Division). A total of 12 teams were given a Bye to the First Round. All matches in this round were completed on 9 April 2012.

The draw was as follows:

 Byes:  Ashfield (3), Dianella White Eagles (3), Fremantle Croatia (5), Fremantle United (4), Gosnells City (3), Melville City (4), Morley-Windmills (3), Shamrock Rovers Perth (3), South Perth United (5), Subiaco AFC (4), UWA-Nedlands (4) and Whitfords City (5).

First round
A total of 32 teams took part in this stage of the competition. 11 of the 12 Clubs from the State League Premier Division entered into the competition at this stage, with the exception of the Football West NTC team, who did not take part.
All matches were completed on 25 April 2012.

The draw was as follows:

Second round
A total of 16 teams took part in this stage of the competition. All matches were completed on 12 May 2012.

The draw was as follows:

Quarter finals
A total of 8 teams took part in this stage of the competition.  All matches in this round were completed on 4 June 2012.

The draw was as follows:

Semi finals
A total of 4 teams took part in this stage of the competition. All matches in this round were completed by 30 July 2012. The draw was as follows:

Final
The 2012 State League Cup Final was held at the neutral venue of Dorrien Gardens on 24 August.

References

Football West State Cup
WA State Challenge Cup